"Stronger" is a song by the English electronic group Clean Bandit with uncredited vocals by Alex Newell and Sean Bass, the brother of Sharna Bass (who sings the vocals of Clean Bandit's song "Extraordinary"). It was originally released on 22 November 2014, with uncredited vocals from Olly Alexander, the lead singer of Years & Years. The song was then re-recorded and released as a single on 19 April 2015. It was also remixed by the American electronic duo Vindata.

Music video 
A contest in collaboration with Microsoft Lumia was held, with the prize being the chance to be a crew member of the music video production. The winners were Wlodek Markowicz and Karol Paciorek from "Lekko Stronniczy".

The video, which was released on 11 March 2015, was made in collaboration with Microsoft, Wlodek Markowicz and Karol Paciorek and featured Microsoft Lumia phones, which were used for the video's bullet time effect, a bus driver singing to the song and dancing to it with others (including Clean Bandit), intermixed with clips of Clean Bandit and a dance group dancing to the song (where the bullet time effect was used). The video was directed by Jack Patterson and produced by Katharine Cowell and had more than 38 million YouTube views by April 2021.

Track listing

Charts

Certifications

Release history

References

2015 singles
2015 songs
Clean Bandit songs
Atlantic Records singles
Songs written by Grace Chatto
Songs written by Jack Patterson (Clean Bandit)